The 2006 Air New Zealand Cup was the inaugural season of the Air New Zealand Cup, contested by teams from New Zealand. The season ran from July to October 2006. At the end of the regular season, the top team from Repechage A and B joined with teams from the Top Six who entered the quarter-finals, with the winners going through to the semi-finals. The winner of each semi-final qualified for the final, which was contested between Waikato and Wellington, with Waikato winning 37–31 to win the first Air New Zealand Cup title.

This season was the first of the expanded competition, which has succeeded the First Division of the National Provincial Championship. It also saw the introduction of four new teams, Hawke's Bay, Counties Manukau, Manawatu and the newly formed Tasman (a merger of Nelson Bays and Marlborough). On 3 June 2006, the Commerce Commission accepted the NZRU proposal of a salary cap for the Air New Zealand Cup. This was mainly so that the talent pool of players could be spread between the 14 rugby unions.

Competition format
Covering ten weeks, the schedule featured a total of 70 matches. The fourteen unions were grouped by the top three places in each pool, they advanced and secured a spot in the top six. Auckland secured the top position at the start of the second round. Competition points from round one carried over to round two, and teams were seeded according to total points won. If necessary of a tiebreaker, when two or more teams finish on equal points, the union who defeated the other in a head-to-head gets placed higher. In case of a draw between them, the side with the biggest points deferential margin will get rights to be ranked above. If they are tied on points difference, it is then decided by a highest scored try count or a coin toss.

Three teams receive two home fixtures in Round Two:
 The first-place teams in each pool (Auckland in Pool A, Waikato in Pool B).
 The higher-ranked of the two second-place teams (Canterbury, which won a tiebreaker by virtue of a better point differential than North Harbour).

The remaining three teams receive only one home fixture apiece.

Similarly, the top two teams in each repechage pool, based on competition points earned in Round one (with tiebreakers applied as needed), earn two home fixtures in Round two, with the other teams receiving one apiece. Bay of Plenty and Counties Manukau earned the extra home fixture in Repechage A, while Southland and Taranaki earned this privilege in Repechage B.

In Round two saw each team in the competition played three fixtures in this round. In the Top Six, each team played the three teams that it did not play in Round one. Each team in the repechage pools played the other teams in its pool once.

For the teams in the Top Six, competition points carried over from Round one. All Top Six teams advanced to the quarterfinals, with their seedings determined by their positions at the end of Round two.

In the two repechage pools, competition points did not carry over from Round one. The top team in each pool at the end of Round two advanced to the quarterfinals. The two repechage winners received the seventh and eighth seeds, determined based on competition points at the end of Round two.

At the end of Week 9, Auckland, Waikato and North Harbour secured home quarter-finals. Bay of Plenty secured the top spot in Repechage A. In Repechage B, Taranaki dropped out of contention for the top spot.

After defeating Manawatu in Week 10, Bay of Plenty clinched the higher placing of the two repechage quarter-final slots. Also in Week 10, Otago's loss to Wellington placed Otago at the bottom of the Top 6 going into the quarter-finals. The fourth home quarter-final went to Wellington; although Canterbury defeated Auckland, they did not earn the bonus point they needed to pass Wellington on the table. Wellington's victory over Canterbury in Week 8 gave them the advantage in the tiebreaker.

Southland earned the top spot in Repechage B by means of a 19-12 bonus-point loss to Northland, putting them one point ahead of the Taniwha.

The battle for the top overall seed came down to the final match in pool play. Waikato claimed the top seed by defeating North Harbour. Regardless of the Waikato-Harbour result, Auckland was assured of no worse than the second seed they eventually received. Harbour received the third seed.

Standings

Round-by-round

Regular season
Confirmed fixture matches for 2006 season as follows:

Round 1

Round 2

Round 3

Round 4

Round 5

Round 6

Round 7

Round 8

Round 9

Round 10

Play-offs

Quarter-finals

Semi-finals

Final

{| border="0" width="100%" 
|-
|

Points scorers

Updated: 10 September 2006

References

National Provincial Championship
2